The BMW Z8 is a roadster produced by German automotive manufacturer BMW from 1998 to 2003. The Z8 was developed under the codename "E52" between 1993 and 1999, through the efforts of a design team led by Chris Bangle from 1993 to 1995. The exterior was designed by Henrik Fisker and the interior by Scott Lempert.

The Z8 originally was designed as a styling exercise intended to evoke and celebrate the 1956–1959 BMW 507. Prototypes were spotted testing between 1996 and 1999. A concept was later developed to preview the Z8, called the Z07 and was showcased in October 1997 at the Tokyo Motor Show.

Z07 Concept
The Z07 Concept had been based on the concurrently running E52 development programme. As a result, practical and regulatory considerations necessitated very few changes for the production model. Comparatively, the windshield of the series production Z8 was more upward, and the car had a larger front airdam. The Z8 hardtop differed from the Z07 in being a double-bubble form with a tapering fairing versus a single dome with a truncated convex rear. The Z07's exotic driver's side helmet fairing was never intended for production, in order to allow easy operation of the power soft top.

The side turn signal repeaters were integrated into the side vents in a fashion that rendered them invisible until activated. The vintage simplicity of the interior was preserved by hiding the modern equipment under retracting panels. Complex compound curves were made through the use of an expensive MIG-welded aluminium space frame.

Specifications and features

This engine, known internally as the S62, was built by BMW Motorsport and was shared with the E39 M5 sports saloon. The engine is located behind the front axle in order to provide the car with a 50/50 weight distribution. The factory claimed a  acceleration time of 4.7 seconds; Motor Trend magazine achieved  in 4.2 seconds. Road & Track measured the car's lateral grip at 0.92. Car and Driver magazine also tested the car and found that it outperformed the contemporary benchmark Ferrari 360 Modena in three important performance categories: acceleration, handling, and braking.

The Z8 used neon exterior lighting, the tail lights and turn indicators are powered by neon tubes that offer quicker activation than standard lightbulbs and are expected to last for the life of the vehicle. Due to the quirk in the US FMVSS regulations, the turn signal indicators in the tail lights are entirely in red colour.

Every car was shipped with a colour-matching metal hardtop with a rear defroster. Unlike many contemporary hardtops, which are provided for practical rather than stylistic considerations, the hardtop of the Z8 was designed from the outset to complement the lines of the car's styling.

In order to keep the interior uncluttered, a number of functions were integrated into multifunction controls. For example, the power windows and mirrors were controlled by a single instrument. Also, the centre-mounted instrument cluster was canted slightly toward the driver. The displacement of gauges to the middle of the dashboard was intended to offer an unimpeded view of the hood and the road ahead.

In order to promote the Z8 to collectors and reinforce media speculation about the car's "instant classic" potential, BMW promised that a 50-year stockpile of spare parts would be maintained in order to support the Z8 fleet. Due to the limited volume of production, all elements of the car were constructed or finished by hand, thereby compounding the importance of ongoing manufacturer support for the type. The price and production process allowed BMW to offer customised options to interested buyers. A significant number of cars with bespoke paint and interior treatments were produced over the course of the four-year production run by BMW Individual, a division of BMW AG.

Z8 Safety Car
A safety car variant of the Z8 was produced for use in the 2001 season of MotoGP.

Alpina Roadster V8

With production of the Z8 completed by November 2002, the Z8 was replaced by the Alpina Roadster V8 in 2003. The Alpina was a departure from the hard-edged sporting focus of the original car, and elements of grand touring intent were evident throughout this final iteration. Instead of the original 6-speed manual and 4.9 L (S62) engine featured in original Z8, the Alpina came only with an automatic transmission, utilising a 5-speed BMW Steptronic transmission mated to a 4.8 L Alpina-tuned BMW M62 V8 engine from the Alpina E39 B10 V8 S. In order to complete the car's transition from a sports car to a refined grand tourer, a softer suspension setting was used. The standard Z8's run-flat tyres on  wheels were discarded in favor of conventional tyres with softer sidewalls mounted on  Alpina wheels. A new softer grade of Nappa leather replaced the Z8's less supple specification, and special Alpina gauges were fitted on the dash board cluster. An Alpina steering wheel with three solid spokes replaced the original, which could not be retrofitted with shift paddles for the automatic transmission. Gear selection was displayed in an Alpina-specific display mounted in front of the steering wheel.

Production of the Roadster V8 amounted to 555 units, 450 of which were exported to the U.S. market and only eight to the UK. In the United States, this special edition of the Z8 was sold directly through BMW dealerships, marking a first for Alpina, whose cars had never been sold through retail channels in the U.S.

Bertone Birusa

Unveiled at the 2003 Geneva Motor Show, the Birusa is a futuristically styled concept car conceived and developed by Bertone. Based on the Z8, it shares the 4.9 L V8 engine from the donor car generating  mated to a 6-speed manual transmission and has carbon fibre gull-wing doors. It also has a variety of innovative technological features including a sunroof that filters UV light, multilingual voice control and a night vision system.

Production
The Z8's spaceframe was produced in the Dingolfing Plant and the car was hand-finished in Munich. A total of 5,703 Z8s were built: 3,160 for the world market and 2,543 for the North American market.

In popular culture

The Z8 was showcased as James Bond's car in the film The World Is Not Enough released in November 1999, from scenes shot in early April 1999. In the film, it is driven by Bond for his mission in Azerbaijan until it is sliced in half by a helicopter equipped with cutting saws. The vehicle is equipped with surface to air missiles that is mostly activated through the car's steering wheel used as a targeting display, and can also be remote controlled through the use of the vehicle's keychain. This was the final BMW car to appear in the James Bond franchise as its 3-year film deal with BMW expired. It later reappeared in the James Bond video games 007 Racing and Agent Under Fire, the latter of which featured the car on the cover. The Z8 can also be driven in the video game Need for Speed: Hot Pursuit 2. Additionally, the car is driven by Jackie Chan's and Jennifer Love Hewitt's characters in The Tuxedo released in September 2002.

U.S. sales

References

External links

Z8
Cars introduced in 2000
Cars discontinued in 2006
Roadsters
Rear-wheel-drive vehicles
Retro-style automobiles